William Flynn (13 December 1948 – 11 July 2007) was a South African actor and comedian, perhaps best known for playing Tjokkie.

Early life
Flynn was born William Frederick Flynn in Cape Town and matriculated from Plumstead High School. He went to the UCT drama school and was a founder member of the Space theatre in Cape Town. He was the son of William Frederick and Mary Elizabeth (Née Morley)

Overview
Flynn was perhaps best known for his portrayal of Tjokkie, a character that he portrayed as a wise-cracking, beer drinking rugby union fan. Flynn had won 13 best actor awards, including the Dublin Critics and Golden Entertainer Awards. Among these were:

 Best Supporting Actor for Doubles – Fleur du Cap – Cape Town – 1987
 Best Actor for Saturday Night at the Palace
 Best Actor Award for Hello and Goodbye – Dublin
 Best Actor Award for a Comedy Play It Again Sam
 Best Screenplay Award for Saturday Night at the Palace
 Best Actor Award for role of Willy Loman in Death of a Salesman

His film writing also won him a Best Screenplay award for Saturday Night at the Palace. His karate comedy movie Kill and Kill Again was a top box office hit in America. Bill's movie of Saturday Night at The Palace won several Vita Film Awards, a Best Actor award at the Italian Taormina Film festival as well as a Merit Award at the Los Angeles Film Festival.

He was a longtime friend and collaborator of the actor and playwright Paul Slabolepszy.

Flynn was also involved in the music world. He was a co-founder and band member of The Rock Rebels (1998–2007) and the lead singer for Vinnie and the Viscounts (1987–1997).

At the time of his death, Flynn was married to actress Jana Cilliers, his second wife.

Death
Flynn died in Johannesburg, South Africa on 11 July 2007 of an apparent heart attack. He was 58 years old. His highly successful career included leading roles in over 140 stage plays, musicals, 42 films, dozens of TV shows and thousands of radio and TV commercials.

Filmography
 1973 House of the Living Dead
 1974 No Gold for a Dead Diver
 1979 Hello and Goodbye
 1981 Kill and Kill Again
 1982 City Lovers
 1983 Prisoners of the Lost Universe
 1983 Funny People II
 1985 Magic Is Alive, My Friend
 1986 Senor Smith
 1987 Saturday Night at the Palace
 1990 Kwagga Strikes Back
 1993 Die Prince van Pretoria
 1994 Kalahari Harry
 1994 Guns of Honor
 1994 Marie s'en va t-en guerre
 1995 Treasure at Elephant Ridge
 1996 Human Timebomb
 1999 Heel Against the Head
 2000 The Carruthers Brothers
 2004 Oh Schuks... I'm Gatvol
 2004 Jozi Streets
 2006 Krakatoa - The Last Days
 2006 Running Riot

Music

CD as singer
 Toyi Kaka – 1995
 I Don't Like Cricket, I Love It – 1996
 B.O.K.K.E. – 1999
 Gees
 Gooi My A Tenor
 Tenors Racket
 Rainbow Warrior

CD as group
 Get Vrot – Vinnie & The Viscounts
 Rock & Roll Party – Vinnie & The Viscounts
 Get This – The Rock Rebels
 Gooi Mielies – The Rock Rebels

References

External links
 
 IOL: Flynn's death leaves gap in industry
 allAfrica.com: Bill Flynn Obituary
  Independent Online: Flynn brought laughter – DA
 Online: Talent and utter niceness Flynn's trademarks
 Variety Magazine: Bill Flynn, 58, South African actor; Veteran thesp won 13 best actor awards
 SABC News: Arts community shocked at Flynn's untimely death
 The Times: Bill Flynn: A seriously funny man
 Shock as actor Bill Flynn dies

Baxter Theatre Stills
 "Living Together" with Jana Cilliers (1979)
 "Saturday Night at the Palace" with Fats Dibeco and Paul Slabolepszy (1983)
 Paul Slabolepszy's "Pale Natives" (1994)
 As Willy Loman in "Death of a Salesman" (2001)
 "Running Riot" with Paul Slabolepszy (2002)

1948 births
2007 deaths
South African male stage actors
University of Cape Town alumni
South African male film actors